HMS Triumph, originally known as Libertad, was the second of the two  pre-dreadnought battleships of the Royal Navy. The ship was ordered by the Chilean Navy, but she was purchased by the United Kingdom as part of ending the Argentine–Chilean naval arms race. Triumph was initially assigned to the Home Fleet and Channel Fleets before being transferred to the Mediterranean Fleet in 1909. The ship briefly rejoined the Home Fleet in 1912 before she was transferred abroad to the China Station in 1913. Triumph participated in the hunt for the German East Asia Squadron of Maximilian Graf von Spee and in the campaign against the German colony at Tsingtao, China early in World War I. The ship was transferred to the Mediterranean in early 1915 to participate in the Dardanelles Campaign against the Ottoman Empire. She was torpedoed and sunk off Gaba Tepe by the German submarine  on 25 May 1915.

Design and description

 
Triumph was ordered by Chile, with the name of Libertad, in response to the Argentine purchase of two armoured cruisers from Italy during a time of heightened tensions with Argentina. After the crisis subsided, financial problems forced Chile to put the ship up for sale in early 1903; concerned that Russia might buy them, the United Kingdom stepped in and with financing via merchant bank Antony Gibbs & Sons purchased the still-incomplete ships from Chile on 3 December 1903 for £2,432,000. The ship was designed to Chilean specifications, particularly the requirement to fit in the graving dock at Talcahuano, and was regarded by the British as a second-class battleship.

General characteristics
In 1906, the crew numbered 729 officers and ratings.

Propulsion
The ship was powered by two four-cylinder inverted vertical triple-expansion steam engines, each driving one propeller. The engines proved to be more powerful than anticipated and Triumph exceeded  during sea trials.

Armament

The ship was armed with four 45-calibre long BL 10-inch Mk VII guns in two twin gun turrets, one each fore and aft of the superstructure. The firing cycle of the Mk VII guns was claimed to be 20–25 seconds; each gun was provided with 90 shells.

Triumphs secondary armament consisted of fourteen 50-calibre long BL 7.5-inch Mk IV guns. Ten of the guns were mounted in a central battery on the main deck; the other four were in casemates abreast the fore- and mainmasts on the upper deck. The ship carried 150 rounds per gun.

Defence against torpedo boats was provided by fourteen QF 14-pounder Mk II guns, but the guns were modified in British service to use the standard  shell used by the QF 12 pounder 18 cwt gun in British service. Their maximum range and rate of fire is unknown. 200 rounds per gun was carried by Triumph. The ship also mounted four QF 6-pounder Hotchkiss guns in the fighting tops, although these were removed in 1906–08.

The ship was also armed with a pair of 17.7-inch (450 mm) submerged torpedo tubes, one on each broadside, for which she carried nine torpedoes.

Armour
The Swiftsures armour scheme was roughly comparable to that of the Duncan class. Fore and aft of the  oblique bulkheads that connected the belt armour to the barbettes, the belt continued, but was reduced in thickness. It was six inches thick abreast the barbettes, but was reduced to two inches fore and aft of the barbettes. It continued forward to the bow and supported the ship's spur-type ram. It continued aft to the steering gear compartment and terminated in a  transverse bulkhead. The upper strake of 7-inch armour covered the ship's side between the rear of the barbettes up to the level of the upper deck. The upper deck casemates were also protected by 7-inch faces and sides, but were enclosed by rear 3-inch plates. The 7.5-inch guns on the main deck were separated by  screens with  plating protecting the funnel uptakes to their rear. A longitudinal 1-inch bulkhead divided the battery down its centreline.

Below this level they thinned to three and two inches respectively. The deck armour inside the central citadel ranged from 1 to 1.5 inches in thickness. Outside the citadel, the lower deck was three inches thick and sloped to meet the lower side of the belt armour.

Construction and service

Pre–World War I

HMS Triumph was ordered by Chile as Libertad and laid down by Vickers, Sons & Maxim at Barrow-in-Furness on 26 February 1902 and launched on 15 January 1903. She was completed in June 1904 and commissioned at Chatham Dockyard on 21 June 1904 for service in the Home Fleet. Under a fleet reorganization in January 1905, the Home Fleet became the Channel Fleet. She collided with her sister ship  on 3 June 1905 and suffered damage to her bow. Triumph received a brief refit at Chatham Dockyard in October 1908 and was transferred to the Mediterranean Fleet on 26 April 1909. The ship returned to the Home Fleet in May 1912. She was transferred to the China Station on 28 August 1913 and was placed in reserve at Hong Kong until mobilized in August 1914 at the beginning of World War I.

World War I

Triumph was recommissioned using the crews of demobilised river gunboats, supplemented with two officers, 100 ratings, and six signallers from the Duke of Cornwall's Light Infantry, and was ready for sea on 6 August 1914. Triumph took part in operations off the German colony of Tsingtao, China in early August 1914, with the intention of stopping German shipping entering or returning to the port. On the evening of 21 August, Triumph captured the German merchant ship Frisia, also carrying coal and cattle. On 23 August 1914, she was attached to the Imperial Japanese Navy's Second Fleet, and after disembarking her Army volunteers at Wei-hai-wei, participated in the campaign against the German colony at Tsingtao. In September, Triumph, together with the destroyer , escorted a convoy carrying British troops for operations against Tsingtao, with Triumph taking part in several bombardments of German positions until the capture of Tsingtao by the Japanese. Triumph was hit by a German shell during a bombardment on 14 October, damaging a mast, and killing one crewman and wounding two more. With Tsingtao in Japanese hands, Triumph returned to Hong Kong for a refit on 19 November 1914.

Upon completion of her refit in January 1915, Triumph was transferred to the Dardanelles for service in the Dardanelles Campaign. The ship departed Hong Kong on 12 January and stopped at Suez from 7 February to 12 February before moving on to join the Dardanelles Squadron. She also took part in the attack on Fort Dardanos on 2 March 1915. She and Swiftsure were detached from the Dardanelles on 5 March for operations against forts at Smyrna, returning to the Dardanelles on 9 March.

Triumph participated in the main attack on the Narrows forts on 18 March, and fired on Ottoman trenches at Achi Baba on 15 April. On the night of 18 April, one of her picket boats and one from Majestic, both armed with torpedoes mounted in dropping gear, attacked the British submarine , which had stranded beneath Fort Dardanos and was being salvaged by German and Ottoman forces; a torpedo from the Majestic boat destroyed the submarine. Triumph supported the main landing by the Anzac forces at Gaba Tepe on 25 April, and continued to support them through May. It belonged to the U-boat  under the command  of Lieutenant Otto Hersing. Triumph opened fire on the periscope, but was almost immediately struck by a torpedo, which easily cut through her torpedo net, on her starboard side. A tremendous explosion resulted, and Triumph took on a list 10° to starboard. She held that list for about five minutes, then it increased to 30°. The destroyer  evacuated most of her crew before she capsized ten minutes later. Three officers and 75 ratings died in her sinking.

In October 2021, Turkey opened the Gallipoli Historic Underwater Park, an underwater museum off Çanakkale accessible to scuba divers. The park includes a number of wrecks from vessels sunk during the Dardanelles and Gallipoli campaigns, including Triumph and the battleship .

Notes

Citations

References

External links
 
 

 

Swiftsure-class battleships
Vickers
Ships built in Barrow-in-Furness
1903 ships
World War I battleships of the United Kingdom
Ships sunk by German submarines in World War I
World War I shipwrecks in the Dardanelles
Maritime incidents in 1915
Maritime incidents in 1905